Gabriella is a feminine given name used in various languages. Its English spelling originates as an Italian feminine given name from the Hebrew name Gabriel. Girls who are named Gabriella often take on a shorter version of the name, such as Bella, Ella, Gab and Gabbi.

List of people with the given name Gabriella

Entertainment
Gabriella Brum (born 1960), German model who won the 1980 Miss World beauty pageant
Gabriella Charlton, reality television personality and actress who works in Tamil-language television and film
Gabriella Cilmi (born 1991), Australian-Italian singer based in Melbourne
Gabriella Cristiani (born 1950), Italian film editor who won the 1987 Academy Award for Best Film Editing
Gabriella Ferri (1942–2004), Italian singer whose self-titled album was released in 1970
Gabriella Gatehouse (born 1994), Brazilian-British model and beauty queen
Gabriella Gatti (1908–2003), Italian operatic soprano
Gabriella Giorgelli (born 1942), Italian film actress
Gabriella Hall (born 1966) (aka Gabriella Skye and Laura Saldivar), model and actress
Gabriella Hámori (born 1978), Hungarian actress
Gabriella Henderson, known as Ella Henderson (born 1996), English singer
Gabriella Leon (born 1996), English actress
 Gabriella Leonardi Born 1996 - English Actress, Model 
Gabriella Licudi (born 1943), Moroccan-born British former actress
Gabriella Mann (born 1995), Swedish fashion model, auditor and beauty pageant titleholder who was crowned Miss Earth Sweden 2020
Gabriella Martinelli, Italian-Canadian film and television producer
Gabriella Pallotta (born 1938), Italian film actress
Gabriella Pession (born 1977), Italian actress
Gabriella Tóth (born 1988), Hungarian singer
Gabriella Tucci (1929–2020), Italian operatic soprano
Gabriella Wilde (born 1989), British actress
Gabriella Wright (born 1982), English actress and model

Literature and art
Gabriella Ambrosio (born 1954), Italian author and former journalist
Gabriella Belli (born 1952), Italian art historian
Gabriella Csire (born 1938), Hungarian children's literature author
Gabriella Goliger, Canadian novelist and short story writer who published books in 2001 and 2010
Gabriella Håkansson (born 1968), Swedish novelist
Gabriella Porpora (born 1942), Italian painter who co-founded the Gruppo 12 art movement
 Gabriella Leonardi (born 1996) English author, poet.

Science
Gabriella Pinzari, Italian mathematician
Gabriella Tarantello (born 1958), Italian mathematician

Sports
Gabriella Csapó-Fekete (born 1954), Hungarian volleyball player
Gabriella Dorio (born 1957), Italian runner and 1984 Olympic gold medal winner
Gabriella Fagundez (born 1985), Swedish swimmer who holds several national records
Gabriella Gáspár (born 1979),  Hungarian former handballer
Gabriella Kain (born 1981), Swedish team handball goalkeeper
Gabriella Kindl (born 1979), Hungarian and Montenegrin handball player
Gabriella Lengyel (born 1960), Hungarian volleyball player
Gabriella Mészáros (1913-1994), Hungarian gymnast
Gabriella Papadakis (born 1995) French ice dancer who won a silver medal at the 2018 Winter Olympics
Gabriella Paruzzi (born 1969), retired Italian cross-country skier who competed from 1991 to 2006
 Gabriela Sabatini (born 1970) Argentinian former world class tennis player in 1980’s and 90’s.  
Gabriella Silva (born 1988), Brazilian butterfly swimmer and model
Gabriella Szabó (born 1975), Romanian runner
Gabriella Szabó (born 1986), Hungarian sprint canoeist who won a silver medal at the 2008 Summer Olympics
Gabriella Szűcs (born 1984), Hungarian team handball player
Gabriella Szűcs (water polo) (born 1988), Hungarian water polo player
Gabriella Tóth (footballer) (born 1986), Hungarian football midfielder
Gabriella Wood (born 1997), Trinidadian international level judoka

Religion, politics, royalty and history
Blessed Sister Maria Gabriella Sagheddu (1914–1939), Italian Trappist nun
Gabriella Selmeczi (born 1965), Hungarian jurist and politician
Princess Maria Gabriella of Savoy (born 1940), daughter of Italy's last king, and an historian
Lady Gabriella Windsor (born 1981) (aka Ella Windsor), English journalist and a member of the British Royal Family
Princess Gabriella, Countess of Carladès (born 2014), second in line to the Monegasque throne

Business
Gabriella Meister, German billionaire businesswoman

Fictional characters
Gabriella, deaf-mute Latina mermaid in episodes of the 1992–1994 Little Mermaid animated TV series
 Gabriella, a fictional character from the TV series Sid the Science Kid
Gabriella Dante, character in the 1999–2007 cable TV series The Sopranos
Gabriella Einarsdotter, fictional character in the Bert Diaries series of books
Gabriella Montez, character in the 2006–2008 Disney channel High School Musical movie series

See also
Gabbi
Gabriela (given name)
Gabrielle (given name)
Gabriel (given name)

Feminine given names